The 1997 Speedway World Team Cup was the 38th edition of the FIM Speedway World Team Cup to determine the team world champions.

The final was held in Piła, Poland on 13 September. Denmark won their 11th title and Hans Nielsen won his 11th and final gold medal. Remarkably Nielsen had won his gold medals in a near twenty year span from 1978 until 1997, cementing his place in history as arguably the best speedway rider of all time.

Qualification

Group B
 June 21, 1997
  Krško

* Belarus and the Netherlands withdrew

 Slovenia and Italy to Group A

Group A

 August 23, 1997
  Debrecen

 Czech Republic and Hungary to Final

World Final
 September 13, 1997
  Piła, Stadion Żużlowy Centrum

See also
 1997 Speedway Grand Prix

References

Speedway World Team Cup
World T